Supawan Tantayanon (born November 3, 1951) is a Thai chemist who is a professor at the Chulalongkorn University. She has previously served as President of the Science Society of Thailand, Council of Science and Technology Professionals of Thailand, and Federation of Asian Chemical Societies.

Early life and education 
After completing high school, Tantayanon was made to choose whether to study science or non-science majors. Tantayanon was an undergraduate student at Chulalongkorn University, where she studied chemistry. She moved to Mahidol University for her master's degree, where she started specialising in organic chemistry. Tantayanon joined the Worcester Polytechnic Institute, where she studied photocatalytic oxidation of N-acylamines supported by a Fulbright Program scholarship.

Research and career 
In 1985, Tantayanon was appointed to faculty at Chulalongkorn University. That year, the Thai government installed the country's first petrochemical complex, and she was responsible for teaching a master's program in petrochemistry. She was appointed Director of the Petroleum and Petrochemical College, and initiated the program's collaborations with industry. She was made a professor at Chulalongkorn University in 2012. Her research considers green chemistry and sustainability.

Tantayanon worked on the development of sustainable chemistry laboratories and chemistry education. She launched a multi-university initiative to eliminate dangerous chemistry in laboratories. She launched an innovation-focused graduate program for chemistry students in Thailand, which was delivered in English.

Awards and honours 
 2019 Mahidol University Outstanding Alumnus of Graduate School
 2021 Services to Chemistry Education
 2021 IUPAC Distinguished Women in Chemistry

Selected publications

References 

1951 births
Living people
Supawan Tantayanon
Supawan Tantayanon
Worcester Polytechnic Institute alumni
Supawan Tantayanon